Coenus is a genus of stink bugs in the family Pentatomidae. There are at least three described species in Coenus.

Species
These three species belong to the genus Coenus:
 Coenus delius (Say, 1832) i c g b
 Coenus explanatus Rider, 1996 i c g
 Coenus inermis Harris and Johnston, 1936 i c g
Data sources: i = ITIS, c = Catalogue of Life, g = GBIF, b = Bugguide.net

References

Further reading

 
 
 

Pentatomidae genera
Articles created by Qbugbot
Carpocorini